Dyurtyuli (Dürtöylö) is a town in the Republic of Bashkortostan, Russia, located on the left bank of the Belaya River  northwest of Ufa. Population:

Etymology
In the Tatar and Bashkir languages, the name of the town means "four houses".

History
The first mention of the town was in 1795. Urban-type settlement status was granted to it in 1964; town status was granted in 1989.

Administrative and municipal status
Within the framework of administrative divisions, Dyurtyuli serves as the administrative center of Dyurtyulinsky District, even though it is not a part of it. As an administrative division, it is, together with the village of Argamak, incorporated separately as the town of republic significance of Dyurtyuli—an administrative unit with the status equal to that of the districts. As a municipal division, the town of republic significance of Duyrtyuli is incorporated within Dyurtyulinsky Municipal District as Dyurtyuli Urban Settlement.

Demographics
As of the 2002 Census, the ethnic composition of the town was:
Tatars: 64.9%
Bashkirs: 22.5%
Russians: 9.7%
Mari: 1.6%

References

Notes

Sources

External links

Official website of Dyurtyuli 
Dyurtyuli Business Directory 

Cities and towns in Bashkortostan